Ryan Redington (born June 29, 1982) is an American dog musher and dog sled racer from Alaska. Redington was the winner of the  Iditarod Trail Sled Dog Race in 2023.

His grandfather, Joe Reddington Sr. Sr, is known as the “Father of the Iditarod” for co-founding the 1,000 mile race in 1973, and helping to establish the route as a National Historic Trail.

References

1982 births
Dog mushers from Alaska
Iditarod champions
Living people
People from Matanuska-Susitna Borough, Alaska